Little Sioux Township is a township in 
Harrison County, Iowa, USA.

References

Townships in Harrison County, Iowa
Townships in Iowa